Andhra University College of Science and Technology is a constituent college of Andhra University established in 1931.

History

The College was started in 1931 as the combined Colleges of Arts, Science and Technology. In later years the combined colleges were bifurcated in the year 1966, with Prof. R.Ramanadham as its first principal.

Schools and departments
The College of Science and Technology is made up of schools as follows:

School of Physics:
 Department of Physics
 Department of Nuclear Physics

School of Chemistry:
 Department of Inorganic and Analytical Chemistry
 Department of Organic Chemistry and Foods, Drugs and Water
 Physical and Nuclear Chemistry and Chemical Oceanography

School of Earth and Atmospheric Sciences:
 Department of Geology
 Department of Geography
 Department of Geophysics
 Department of Meteorology and Oceanography

School of Mathematical Sciences:
 Department of Mathematics
 Department of Applied Mathematics and
 Department of Statistics.

School of Life Sciences:
 Department of Botany
 Department of Zoology
 Department of Marine Living Resources
 Department of Biochemistry
 Department of Human Genetics
 Department of Environmental Sciences
 Department of Microbiology
 Department of Biotechnology

Research and Development Centres
 Delta Studies Institute
 Population Research Centre
 Centre for Nuclear Techniques
 Centre for Marine Archaeology
 Hydrology and Water Management with Rural Bias
 University Science Instrumentation Centre

Academics
The Courses offered in the College are:

 M.Sc. (Two Year Courses)
 M.Sc. (Tech) - 3 Year Courses
 P.G.Diploma - 1 Year Course
 M.Phil. - In all the Departments
 PhD - In all the Departments

Eminent alumni
 U. Aswathanarayana, Honorary Director of the Mahadevan International Centre for Water Resources Management, India
 Trivikram Srinivas, M.Sc (Nuclear Physics), Film director

External links
 Official website of AU College of Science and Technology

Colleges affiliated to Andhra University
1931 establishments in India
Educational institutions established in 1931